The Linear Tape File System (LTFS) is a file system that allows files stored on magnetic tape to be accessed in a similar fashion to those on disk or removable flash drives. It requires both a specific format of data on the tape media and software to provide a file system interface to the data.

The technology, based around a self-describing tape format developed by IBM, was adopted by the LTO Consortium in 2010.

History 
Magnetic tape data storage has been used for over 50 years, but typically did not hold file metadata in a form easy to access or modify independent of the file content data.  Often external databases were used to maintain file metadata (file names, timestamps, directory hierarchy) to hold this data but these external databases were generally not designed for interoperability and tapes might or might not contain an index of their content. In Unix-like systems, there is the  tar interoperable standard, but this is not well-suited to allow modification of file metadata independent of modifying file content data - and does not maintain a central index of files nor provide a filesystem interface or characteristics.

LTFS technology was first implemented by IBM as a prototype running on Linux and Mac OS X during 2008/2009. This prototype was demonstrated at NAB 2009. Based on feedback from this initial demonstration and experience within IBM the filesystem was overhauled in preparation for release as a product. The LTFS development team worked with the vendors of LTO tape products (HP and Quantum) to build support and understanding of the LTFS format and filesystem implementation leading up to the public release.

The LTFS Format Specification and filesystem implementation were released on April 12, 2010 with the support of IBM, HP, Quantum, and the LTO Consortium.

LTFS v2.0.0 was released in March 2011, improving the text to clarify and remove ambiguity. It also added support for sparse files; persistent file identifiers; virtual extended attributes for filesystem metadata and control - and defined  minimum and recommended blocksize values for LTFS volumes, for compatibility across various HBA hardware implementations.

Format specification 
The ISO/IEC 20919:2016 standard defines the LTFS Format requirements for interchanged media that claims LTFS compliance. It defines the data format, independent of the physical storage media and the software commands format, to make data truly interchangeable. The ISO standard was
prepared by SNIA. It is based on LTFS v2.2, and was adopted to ISO by a joint technical committee ISO/IEC JTC 1 Information Technology.

The SNIA workgroup continues to develop LTFS and release updates. Version 2.0.0 defines rules for how the version number may change in future, and how compatibility is maintained across varying implementations. All implementations must:
 correctly read media that was compliant with any prior version
 write media that is compliant with the version they claim compliance with

SNIA Technical Work Group 
In August 2012, SNIA announced that it was forming a TWG (Technical Work Group) to continue technical development of the specification. LTFS Format Specification v 2.1 is the baseline for the technical work and standards accreditation process; SNIA LTFS TWG members include HP, IBM, Oracle and Quantum.

Nature
While LTFS can make a tape appear to behave like a disk, it does not change the fundamentally sequential nature of tape. Files are always appended to the end of the tape. If a file is modified and overwritten or removed from the volume, the associated tape blocks used are not freed up, they are simply marked as unavailable and the used volume capacity is not recovered. Data is only deleted and capacity recovered if the whole tape is reformatted.

In spite of these disadvantages, there are several uses cases where LTFS formatted tape is superior to disk and other data storage technologies. While LTO seek times can range from 10 to 100 seconds, the streaming data transfer rate can match or exceed disk data transfer rates. Additionally, LTO cartridges are easily transportable and hold far more data than any other removable data storage format. The ability to copy a large file or a large selection of files (up to 1.5TB uncompressed data for LTO-5, and 18TB for LTO-9) to an LTFS formatted tape, allows easy exchange of data to a collaborator, or the saving of an archival copy.

Since LTFS is an open standard, LTFS formatted tapes are usable by a wide variety of computing systems.

Implementations 
Tape drives manufacturers often offer two different editions, one for Single Drives and one for Tape Libraries, based on the LTFS Reference Implementation.

IBM Linear Tape File System - Single Drive Edition 
The IBM Linear Tape File System - Single Drive Edition, (initially released as "IBM Long Term File System"), allows tapes to be formatted as an LTFS volume, and for these volumes to be mounted - and users and applications access files and directories stored on the tape directly, including drag-and-drop of files.

IBM Linear Tape File System - Library Edition 
The IBM Linear Tape File System - Library Edition (LTFS-LE) product allows LTFS volumes to be used in a tape library. Each LTFS-formatted tape cartridge in the library appears as a separate folder under the filesystem mount point and the user or application can navigate into each of these folders to access the files stored on each tape. The LTFS-LE software automatically controls the tape library robotics to load and unload the necessary LTFS volumes.

Oracle's StorageTek Linear Tape File System, Open Edition 
Oracle's free open source StorageTek Linear Tape File System (LTFS), Open Edition software is claimed to be the first to store 8.5TB (native capacity) on a single cartridge. It supports Oracle’s midrange StorageTek LTO 5 and LTO 6 tape drives from HP and IBM as well as Oracle’s StorageTek T10000C and T10000D tape drives.

Oracle's StorageTek Linear Tape File System, Library Edition 
Oracle’s StorageTek LTFS-LE software offering supports the StorageTek SL8500 Modular Library System, the StorageTek SL3000 Modular Library System, and the StorageTek SL150 Modular Tape.

HP Linear Tape File System 
The HP Linear Tape File System (HP LTFS) is HP's implementation. It is a free open source software application.

Quantum Linear Tape File System 
Quantum Corporation provided an LTFS product with Windows, Linux and Mac OS X support.

The Scalar LTFS Appliance was a file system that presented a Quantum tape library as an NAS share. This appliance made files viewable as if they resided on a local disk and allowed users to drag and drop files directly to and from a tape cartridge.

LTFS compatible products

DDS Tape Drives 
 HPE:
 DAT-160 and DAT-320

Enterprise Tape Drives 
 IBM:
 TS1140, TS1150, TS1155 and TS1160
 Oracle (Sun/StorageTek):
 T10000C and T10000D

LTO Tape Drives 
 HPE, IBM, Quantum, and Tandberg:
 from LTO-5 to LTO-9

Appliances and ISVs (Independent Software Vendors) supporting LTFS 
A full set of vendors are listed at LTO website.

LTFS projects 
 Thought Equity Motion is executing a major film digitization and preservation project for the EYE Film Institute Netherlands. The project involves scanning more than 150 million discrete DPX files and storing them on LTO Gen5 using the LTFS format. More than 1 petabyte of film will be scanned and archived over two years (2010–2012).

Industry recognition 
 IBM LTFS technology received a Pick Hit Award from Broadcast Engineering at NAB 2011.
 IBM and FOX Networks received an Engineering Emmy Award in 2011 for a project that uses LTFS to store, exchange, and archive video content.
 IBM received the 2011 Hollywood Post-Alliance (HPA) Engineering Excellence Award.

References

External links 
 LTFS at LTO
 LTFS at SNIA
 LTFS for Dummies Book
 Implementations:
  (LTFS Reference Implementation for stand alone tape drive)
 IBM Spectrum Archive - IBM Spectrum Archive Single Drive Edition (SDE) 
 Oracle Tape Storage -  Oracle Linear Tape File System, Open Edition
 HP Linear Tape File System - HPE LTFS Software
 Quantum Linear Tape File System -  Quantum LTFS Source
 

Computer file systems
Computer storage tape media
IBM file systems